This is a list of films which have placed number one at the weekly box office in the United Kingdom during 1995.

Number one films

Highest-grossing films
Highest-grossing films in the U.K. for the calendar year

References

See also 
 List of British films — British films by year

1995
United Kingdom
Box office number-one films